Malin Isabel Sofie Dos Santos Cardoso Olsson (born March 19, 1982) is a Swedish television presenter and a former singer and beauty queen.

Career
Olsson was crowned Miss Sweden in 2001, Olsson went on to represent Sweden in Miss Universe 2001 in Puerto Rico. After ending her reign as Miss Sweden she signed on to becoming a member of the girl music group NG3 which released a few successful music singles between 2002 and 2003 and then disbanded. In 2005, Olsson was headhunted by The Voice TV in Sweden and Vecko Revyn to host a show on the music network, soon afterwards she was hired by SVT to present the kids show Bobster which she has presented since. Olsson has been presenting the SVT kids show Sommarlov since 2010, and has also presented the game show Minuten, Magiskt and Hela Sveriges Fredag amongst other shows also on SVT.

References

Miss Universe 2001 contestants
People from Orsa Municipality
Swedish beauty pageant winners
Swedish female models
Swedish television hosts
21st-century Swedish singers
21st-century Swedish women singers
Swedish people of Portuguese descent
Swedish women television presenters
1982 births
Living people